Asian Garden Mall, known in Vietnamese as Phước Lộc Thọ, is a shopping center in Westminster, California.  Opened in 1987, Asian Garden Mall is the first and largest Vietnamese-American shopping mall and is seen as a symbol of the community.  The mall is located at 9200 Bolsa Avenue, serving as the focal point of Little Saigon in Orange County and is the site of many cultural and political events in the Vietnamese-American community.

Names 
In Vietnamese the mall is called Phước Lộc Thọ, which has the same meaning as the Chinese name , from the names of three deities in traditional Chinese and Vietnamese beliefs representing fortune (phước), prosperity (lộc), and longevity (thọ).  To attract non-Vietnamese customers, the developers gave it the English name Asian Garden Mall.  In Vietnamese-language media and vernacular of local Vietnamese-speaking people, the mall is invariably called Phước Lộc Thọ.

History 

The history of Asian Garden Mall is intimately connected to the history of Little Saigon, underscoring its central role in the area.  Following the Fall of Saigon on April 30, 1975, many Vietnamese people moved to Orange County and started many businesses.  In 1978, Frank Jao, a Vietnamese with Chinese roots, started the real estate  firm Bridgecreek Development and bought empty land alongside Bolsa Avenue for development.  By 1987, there were more than 550 businesses operating in the area, and each weekend brought in 20,000 to 50,000 shoppers.

Asian Garden Mall was developed since 1986 and opened for business the following year, as the second phase of Jao's development plan for the land that Bridgecreek owned alongside Bolsa Avenue.  The first phase was a shopping center across the street from Asian Garden Mall named Asian Village, developed in 1985. Development involved capital from many Asian investors, including a Chinese Indonesian and Roger Chen, who started the 99 Ranch Market chain with the first location inside Asian Village.  The total cost of the mall was $15 million. To attract non-Vietnamese customers and investors, Jao gave the projects names that de-emphasize their Vietnamese-ness (such as "Asian Garden Mall") and lobbied to name the area "Asiantown" instead of "Little Saigon" that many Vietnamese activists were calling for. However, his effort to name the area "Asiantown" was unsuccessful; meanwhile, Asian Garden Mall immediately became a mainstay of the community after opening—in 1988 the Governor of California George Deukmejian came to the mall to inaugurate the business area with the name "Little Saigon".

In the mid-1990s, the mall faced the prospect of irrelevancy as younger Vietnamese Americans joined mainstream society and moved further away from Little Saigon. Community leaders wanted to attract younger people. In order to attract mainstream visitors, Jao wanted to reduce the Vietnamese nature of Little Saigon. However, this proposal encountered stiff opposition from the Vietnamese community; opponents objected to the Chinese-influenced motifs in the bridge's exterior decorations, complaining that the design was "too Chinese" and did not accurately represent Vietnamese culture. In the end, his company was forced to scrap the plan.

During the COVID-19 pandemic, Asian Garden Mall was forced to close, along with other malls in California.  To cope, the mall turned its parking lot into an open-air market with many shops. The mall reopened in 2021 at limited capacity, and was fully open by 2022.

Description 

Asian Garden Mall is the largest shopping mall in Little Saigon and the largest shopping center for Vietnamese people in the United States. Although its English name only mentions Asian people and does not specifically highlight its Vietnamese roots, goods, and services in the mall are primarily provided by Vietnamese shop owners catering to Vietnamese customers, especially cultural and culinary products.

The mall consists of a 2-story building, with a parking lot in the front and back.  In front of the building there are statues of the three eponymous deities Phước, Lộc, and Thọ, along with a statue of Di-lặc.  The building has distinctive architecture, communicating its Vietnamese and Chinese-Vietnamese heritage.  It has a roof made with green tiles; in front of the building is an ornate gateway with an ornate curved roof with ridge ornaments leading to the mall.  Landscaping included miniature plants and trees.  Inside, the mall is decorated with Vietnamese and Asian symbols such as red paper lanterns, fans, as well as statues and figurines.

Inside the mall there are about 300 shops, selling Chinese herbs, cosmetics, clothing, food, CDs, and DVDs, including about 200 shops selling jewelry and gemstones. Cultural products for sale in the mall are primarily those made by production companies in Orange County as well as those produced in Vietnam. On the lower level there is a food court serving a variety of Vietnamese food, from bánh mì, phở, rice dishes, to sugarcane juice, Vietnamese iced coffee, or various fruit smoothies.  On the upper level there are shops selling jewelry, cosmetics, and luxury goods. Also on the upper level is a Taoist shrine dedicated to Guan Yu.

Visitors to the mall come from many places, representing various economic backgrounds, but are primarily Vietnamese.

Annual events 

For Tết, the portion of Bolsa Avenue passing through the mall is the starting place for the annual Tết Parade organized by the city of Westminster.  Firecrackers are set off in front of the mall to signal the start of the parade. The parade has been organized since 1996, occurring on the Saturday closest to the holiday, attracting about 20,000 annual attendees and is broadcast live on local Vietnamese-language TV and radio stations.

On summer weekends, the front parking lot is turned into a night market, serving snacks and attracting younger visitors. Food served at the night market are typically Vietnamese, reminiscent of the night markets in Vietnam. The night market attracts about 3000 visitors each night.

During the Mid-Autumn Festival, variety shows are performed on the stage in front of Asian Garden Mall.

For several weeks before Tết, the parking lot in front of the mall is turned into a holiday market, with flowers and various Tết paraphernalia available for sale. Several days prior to the holiday, Little Saigon TV coordinates with the mall to organize contests inside the mall, attracting many participants.  The contests include those for making bánh chưng, fruit decorating, and wearing the traditional áo dài.

Significance 
Asian Garden Mall is not simply a shopping center, it also serves as a symbol for the Vietnamese community in Orange County as well as in the United States. It has become a tourist destination—according to surveys from the development company, about half of mall visitors come from outside Orange County. Many community leaders describe it as the "center" or "heart" of the Vietnamese-American community, and view its role in generating and shaping community life as significant.

The symbolic role of Asian Garden Mall can be seen when many politicians, especially from the Republican Party, use the mall as the venue for rallies when campaigning for political office with Vietnamese-American voters, including Bob Dole, John McCain, and George W. Bush.

Aside from its commercial use, the mall is also used as a communal space.  Many elderly people use it to meet up with friends, play Chinese chess, or drink coffee. As the most famous and most recognizable landmark in Little Saigon, Asian Garden Mall also serves as an orienting device—a central meeting place with friends before going elsewhere.  Although the mall is described as the "heart" of Little Saigon, many locals try to avoid going there directly because of the crowds and difficulty finding a parking spot.  Karín Aguilar-San Juan of Macalester College argues in her book about Little Saigons that the mall has become a mental destination, with possibly bigger meaning than just a shopping venue.

Gallery

Citations

References

Bibliography

Books

Research

News stories

English language

Vietnamese language

External links 
Official site

Orange County, California
Vietnamese diaspora
Articles containing traditional Chinese-language text
Vietnamese-American culture in California
Coordinates not on Wikidata
Shopping malls in Orange County, California
Shopping malls established in 1987
Ethnic shopping centers
1987 establishments in California